Bruno Zebie (born August 14, 1995) is a former professional soccer player who played as a midfielder. Born in France, Zebie represented Canada at youth level.

Early life
Zebie was born in Paris, France to parents of Ivorian descent and moved to Lachine, Quebec at age six, later moving to Brossard, Quebec. His family then moved to Edmonton when he was 13. He began playing youth soccer with Edmonton Juventus before joining the FC Edmonton Academy in 2012. In 2016, he joined the Edmonton Green and Gold youth academy.

University career
In 2016, he began attending the University of Alberta, where he played for the men's soccer team. In his first season, he was named a Canada West Second Team All-Star, winning the U Sports Men's Soccer Championship with the team. In 2017, he was named a Canada West First Team All-Star.

Club career
Zebie joined FC Edmonton's senior side in the North American Soccer League on July 3, 2015 on a week-to-week contract. He made his first appearance on July 13 against the Fort Lauderdale Strikers, as a substitution for Michael Nonni. 

After the NASL folded, Zebie played with the Calgary Foothills for the 2017 and 2018 Premier Development League seasons. The club would end up champions in 2018, capturing the PDL Championship in a 2-1 victory over Reading United in the final.

Zebie returned to FC Edmonton on December 13, 2018, ahead of the inaugural season of the Canadian Premier League. In November 2019, Edmonton announced Zebie would not be returning to the club for the 2020 season.

On February 5, 2020, Zebie signed with Alberta rival Cavalry FC, becoming the first player to play for both Al Classico rival clubs, reuniting with his former Calgary Foothills coach Tommy Wheeldon Jr. He appeared in all ten of Cavalry's matches that year. On January 26, 2021, the club announced it had declined Zebie's contract option for 2021 (due to league rules of having 4 international imports), making him a free agent. Following the season, he returned to his hometown of Edmonton to coach.

International career
Zebie has been called up to camps for Canada at the under-18 and under-20 level. In 2013, he took part in the L'Alcúdia International Football Tournament as an under-18 Canada team finished fourth in the annual under-20 tournament.

Personal life
Zebie's elder brother Allan was also a professional soccer player.

Honours
University of Alberta Golden Bears
 U Sports Men's Soccer Championship: 2016

Calgary Foothills
 Premier Development League: 2018

Individual
 Canada West Second Team All-Star: 2016
 Canada West First Team All-Star: 2017

References

External links
 
 

1995 births
Living people
Association football midfielders
Canadian soccer players
Footballers from Paris
Soccer players from Edmonton
French sportspeople of Ivorian descent
Canadian people of Ivorian descent
Black Canadian soccer players
French emigrants to Canada
Naturalized citizens of Canada
FC Edmonton players
Alberta Golden Bears players
Calgary Foothills FC players
Cavalry FC players
North American Soccer League players
USL League Two players
Canadian Premier League players
Canada men's youth international soccer players